Harry Nadjarian is the founder of Industrial Motor Parts, now known as Industrial Motor Power Corporation.

Biography
Nadjarian was born in Beirut into a Lebanese-Armenian family. In 1975, he immigrated to the United States following the start of the Lebanese civil war.

Nadjarian is Founder and Chairman of the Board of Industrial Motor Power Corporation (IMP) where he built the company from a California engine and generator repair company into an international power trading corporation. As Chairman, he oversees IMP business strategy, government and community relations, and strategic partnerships.  He is the controlling shareholder of all IMP subsidiaries including IMP-Latin America (formerly International Power Traders), Rental Power Solutions, Industry Trader Corporation, and IMP Energy Solutions, and is also Managing Partner at ARCH Properties, LLC.

Nadjarian is the recipient of the Ellis Island Medal of Honor, California Representative at Statue of Liberty Centennial Celebration, House of Lebanon’s Pride of Heritage Award, and the Prince of Cilicia Medal which was presented to him by Catholicos Aram I.

Philanthropy
Nadjarian is an Advisory Board Member for Amideast and is a Member on the Board of Trustees of Haigazian University in Beirut, Lebanon. He is also a philanthropic donor to the AMAA, Haigazian University, the American Red Cross, the Boy Scouts of America, the Armenian Relief Society, the AGBU, City of Hope, The Orphans Fund, the Armenian Cultural Foundation, the Lebanese American Foundation, the Armenian Apostolic Schools of California, the American General Athletic Union, and chaired the Earthquake Relief Fund for Armenia in 1988.  Additionally, he and his family have established scholarship funds for students in need in the United States, Lebanon, and Armenia.

References

Year of birth missing (living people)
Living people
American industrialists
Businesspeople from Beirut